The 1982–83 Galatama was the third season of Galatama that was held from 28 August 1982 to 28 May 1983. It was the first season in which the league was split into two divisions. It was also the first season which saw foreign players compete in officially sanctioned Indonesian football competition.

Teams

Premier Division 
 NIAC Mitra
 Jayakarta
 Indonesia Muda
 Warna Agung
 Pardedetex
 Mercu Buana
 Perkesa '78
 Makassar Utama
 Arseto
 UMS '80
 Tunas Inti
 Jaka Utama
 Angkasa
 Sari Bumi Raya
 Bintang Timur

First Division 
 Cahaya Kita
 Semen Padang
 Bima Kencana
 Caprina
 Tempo Utama
 Mataram Putra

Foreign players 
There were four foreign players contracted to Galatama clubs this season.

League table

Premier Division

First Division

References

External links 
 Indonesia 1982/83 - RSSSF

Indo
Galatama
Top level Indonesian football league seasons